Skidmore College is a private liberal arts college in Saratoga Springs, New York. Approximately 2,650 students are enrolled at Skidmore pursuing a Bachelor of Arts or Bachelor of Science degree in one of more than 60 areas of study.

History
Skidmore College has undergone many transformations since its founding in the early 20th century as a women's college. The Young Women's Industrial Club was formed in 1903 by Lucy Ann Skidmore (1853–1931) with inheritance money from her husband who died in 1879, and from her father, Joseph Russell Skidmore (1821–1882), a former coal merchant. In 1911, the club was chartered under the name "Skidmore School of Arts" as a college to vocationally and professionally train young women.

Charles Henry Keyes became the first president of the school in 1912, and in 1919 Skidmore conferred its first baccalaureate degrees under the authority of the University of the State of New York. By 1922 the school had been chartered independently as a four-year, degree-granting college.

Skidmore College was established in downtown Saratoga Springs, but on October 28, 1961, the college acquired the Jonsson Campus,  of land on the outer edges of Saratoga Springs. The Jonsson Campus was named for the Skidmore trustee Erik Jonsson, the founder and president of Texas Instruments and a former mayor of Dallas, Texas (1964–71). The new Jonsson Tower bears his name. The first new buildings on the campus opened in 1966, and by 1973 the move was mostly complete. The old campus was sold to Verrazzano College, a new institution that did not prove successful, and its buildings have since been put to other uses.

In 1971, the college began admitting men to its regular undergraduate program (a few dozen male World War II veterans had been admitted in 1946–49). Skidmore also launched the "University Without Walls" (UWW) program, which allows nonresident students over age 25 to earn bachelor's degrees. The program ended in May 2011. Also in 1971, Skidmore established a Phi Beta Kappa chapter.

In 1988, Skidmore faculty formed the Collaborative Research Program, which provides students with opportunities to co-author papers and studies with professors. Skidmore began granting master's degrees in 1991 through its Master of Arts in Liberal Studies (MALS) program. The Skidmore Honors Forum was founded in 1998.

In 2020, Marc C. Conner, Ph.D. became the college's eighth president, replacing Philip A. Glotzbach, who had served as president since 2003. In February 2019, Glotzbach had announced that he would retire at the end of the 2019–2020 school year.

2006 marked the start of the largest campaign in Skidmore's history, Creative Thought. Bold Promise. The goal was to raise $200 million, which was reached and surpassed in 2010 and celebrated at Celebration Weekend.

Presidents
 Charles Henry Keyes, 1912–1925
 Henry T. Moore, 1925–1957
 Val H. Wilson, 1957–1965
 Joseph C. Palamountain Jr., 1965–1987
 David H. Porter, 1987–1999
 Jamienne S. Studley, 1999–2003
 Philip A. Glotzbach, 2003–2020
 Marc C. Conner, 2020–present

Academics
Skidmore offers 44 undergraduate majors, an average class size of 16, and more than 1000 courses.  The World Languages and Literatures Department offers classes in six languages and self-instructional coursework in five additional languages. Its most popular majors, based on 2021 graduates, were:
Business/Commerce (92)
Psychology (42)
English Language & Literature (39)
Political Science & Government (31)
Exercise Physiology & Kinesiology (22)
History (22)
Biology/Biological Sciences (21)
Fine Arts & Art Studies (21)

Students are also encouraged to take their education outside of the classroom with internships. These can be taken for credit and can be completed throughout the academic year; nearly 85% of students participate in an internship during their Skidmore career. Opportunities for these internships are highly publicized both by the departments themselves and by the career center.
Due to the definition of degrees by New York State, Skidmore cannot accredit all departments with a Bachelors of Science. A B.S. is given to those students majoring in art (studio), dance, dance-theater, education, exercise science, business, social work, and theater. The distinction rests in the number of hours of "non-liberal arts" courses allowed toward the 120 credit hours needed for graduation, 60 for a B.S. and 30 for a B.A. These "non-liberal arts"-designated courses are considered by the college to be of a professional nature.

Rankings and reputation

Skidmore is considered one of the Hidden Ivies according to Greenes' Guides to Educational Planning (2000). Skidmore has been named as one of the "New Ivies" by Newsweek.<ref>{{cite web|title=Americas 25 New Elite Ivies|url=http://www.newsweek.com/2006/08/20/25-new-ivies.html|publisher=newsweek.com|access-date=October 2, 2019|date=August 21, 2006}}</ref> The college was ranked tied for the 38th best national liberal arts college in the 2022 edition of U.S. News & World Report. The 2020 Wall Street Journal/Times Higher Education ranking of U.S. colleges and universities placed Skidmore at 93rd. For its 2019 America's Top Colleges list, Forbes rated Skidmore 101st overall.

Admissions profile
The number of new students enrolling in the Fall of 2017 (class of 2021) was 665; For the class of 2021, total applications were 10,052, with an overall 24.5% acceptance rate, and a yield rate (the percentage of accepted students who enroll) of 26.8%. The median SAT score for the Class of 2021 was 1320, while the median ACT score was 30.

Campus and facilities

Most of the buildings on Skidmore's  campus were constructed after 1960.

The Frances Young Tang Teaching Museum and Art Gallery is the college's main arts facility. In addition to the Tang, Skidmore has undergraduate studio space as well as several smaller galleries. The Saisselin Art Building houses studios for animation, ceramics, communication design, drawing, fibers, metals, painting, photography, printmaking, and sculpture. Skidmore has a music program housed in the Arthur Zankel Music Center, which contains a large concert hall and facilities.

Most humanities classes are held in one of four academic buildings: Palamountain, Tisch, Bolton, and Ladd. Harder Hall houses math and computer science; geology, chemistry, physics, and biology operate out of Dana Science Center. Almost every classroom at Skidmore is equipped with a computer and a projector, and many contain other audiovisual equipment such DVD players and slide projectors. The average class size is 17 (generally smaller in lab courses) and the typical student-to-teacher ratio is 8:1.

The Lucy Scribner Library houses approximately half a million volumes. Its five floors contain a large computer lab, approximately sixty open computers on the main floor, with classrooms and private offices. A collection of rare books is kept in the third floor Pohndorff Room. The third floor has a children's library which is used by Saratoga residents.

Skidmore maintains nine on-campus residence halls (Howe Hall, Jonsson Tower, Kimball Hall, McClellan Hall, Penfield Hall, Rounds Hall, Wait Hall, Wiecking Hall and Wilmarth Hall) and three on-campus apartment complexes (North Woods Village, Sussman Village, and the Hillside Houses).

Residence Hall rooms at Skidmore are quite large and the college usually appears on the Princeton Review's "Dorms Like Palaces" list. Most residence halls are arranged in suite style with three or four bedrooms sharing one common bathroom. Most suites are single sex. Gender-neutral housing is available in Wiecking Hall, the Sussman Village, Hillside, and North Woods apartments. The North Woods Apartments can hold 380 people in three- and four-person apartments. The Sussman Village apartments, popular among seniors, mainly consist of four-person apartments.

The aptly named Falstaff's was built in 1986 as a student pub. It is now a largely used as a venue for student sponsored musical performances.

Much of Skidmore's property is taken up by North Woods, a  forest that adjoins the academic campus and reaches up to the bottom of the Adirondack mountains. The woods contain hiking trails that are also open to the general public.

 The Frances Young Tang Teaching Museum and Art Gallery 

The Frances Young Tang Teaching Museum and Art Gallery was opened in 2000, and was designed by the architect Antoine Predock. Predock's design includes two major gallery wings (the Wachenheim Gallery and the Malloy Wing), two smaller galleries (the State Farm Mezzanine and the Winter Gallery), digitally equipped classrooms, and several event spaces. The Tang is nationally known for both its architecture and its holdings, and its excellence has been recognized by The New York Times, Art in America, and Architectural Digest, among other publications. The Tang receives roughly 40,000 visitors annually. The Tang recently hosted a retrospective of the work of Alma Thomas in partnership with the Studio Museum in Harlem.

Arthur Zankel Music Center

In a record-breaking donation made by the estate of Arthur Zankel, Skidmore received $46 million, part of which was used as a lead gift to build the state-of-the-art Arthur Zankel Music Center. Designed by Ewing Cole, the building won awards even before it was built. Most notably, it is lauded for its environmentally friendly nature. For example, rainwater is collected on the roof and turned into usable water in restrooms.

Janet Kinghorn Bernhard Theater
Janet Kinghorn Bernhard '26, while a senior at Skidmore, became the first editor of the Skidmore News. In the 1960s, she and her husband, Arnold (a Skidmore trustee), committed themselves to building a theater on the new campus. They were both present in 1987 to see their long-awaited dream come true at the dedication of the Janet Kinghorn Bernhard Theater. The facility has a main theater with 300 seats that is the site of most major productions, as well as a convertible black-box space. The main theater is also the home of the annual National College Comedy Festival. The Janet Kinghorn Bernhard Theater was named the #16 Best College Theater by the Princeton Review.

Campus Plan
Lo-Yi Chan, architect and campus planner and apprentice of famous architect I. M. Pei, created Skidmore's latest Campus Plan in 2007. Among other proposals it envisions expanding the campus with the addition of another academic quad.

Student life
Student Government Association
The Skidmore College Student Government Association (SGA) is the governing body of the roughly 130 student-run clubs and organizations on campus. In addition to being the official liaison between students and the administration, the Skidmore Student Government Association advocates for college policies that benefit the short - and long-term - interests of the student body. The primary functioning and operation of the SGA is done by the executive committee. The Student Senate is the largest and final body in most matters. The Class Councils are primarily responsible for planning events. There are other SGA Committees and many other individual students appointed to Faculty Committees, All-College Committees and adjudicatory bodies.

Student media

SalmagundiSalmagundi is a quarterly journal that focuses on the humanities and social sciences. Founded by Robert Boyers, a long-time faculty member in the English department, it has been published at Skidmore since 1969 and now has an international subscriber base of several thousand readers.

Each issue generally includes poetry, fiction, interviews, and essays. Salmagundi's editors often devote large sections of an issue to a timely special subject. Recent theme issues include "The Culture of the Museum", "Nigerian Mathematics", "Homosexuality", "Art and Ethics", "The Culture Industry", "Kitsch", and "FemIcons."

Nadine Gordimer, J. M. Coetzee, Tzvetan Todorov, George Steiner, Orlando Patterson, Norman Manea, Christopher Hitchens, Seamus Heaney, Mary Gordon, Susan Sontag, Benjamin Barber, Joyce Carol Oates, Richard Howard, Carolyn Forche, Martin Jay, and David Rieff are among the writers who have contributed to Salmagundi. Regular columnists include Benjamin Barber, Tzvetan Todorov, Martin Jay, Charles Molesworth, Marilynne Robinson, Carolyn Forché, and Mario Vargas Llosa.

The Skidmore NewsThe Skidmore News is the college's official student-run newspaper. Its staff is composed entirely of students, and it is published on a weekly basis during the academic year. In 2002, the Associated Collegiate Press awarded the newspaper first place for a four-year college weekly for special coverage of the community reaction to the September 11 attacks. In 2010, The Skidmore News stopped printing physical copies and moved entirely online.

The Skidmo' DailyThe Skidmo' Daily is the college's satirical publication. It was founded in 2013 by Jack Rosen '16, and its editorial board and staff are made up of students. Since July 2016 the paper has been posting content to its website, which includes web-exclusive content not found in the print editions, as well as an archive of print editions.

SkidTV
SkidTV is the college's official student-run closed-circuit television station. The club is dedicated to promoting top quality programming while covering events on campus and in the surrounding area.

WSPN
WSPN 91.1 FM is Skidmore's radio station. It is administered by a board of directors composed entirely of undergraduates. Students, college employees, and residents of the local community are eligible to host shows, but they must apply to the board in order to win timeslots. Competition for high-profile slots is fierce.

WSPN's staff strives to create a cutting-edge mix of musical programming and talk shows. Although it is a small station with a small broadcast area, it has built up a reputation for innovative programming. The Princeton Review consistently ranks it among the nation's top college radio stations, and its internet broadcast reaches listeners throughout the country. Full Metal Racket Show has broadcast from this station every Friday night for the last 25 years.

Skidmore Unofficial
Skidmore Unofficial is a popular on-campus news and humor blog, documenting undergraduate life from an alternative perspective. It is completely student-run and unaffiliated with the administration.

National College Comedy Festival
The National College Comedy Festival is an annual not-for-profit festival of student sketch and improvisational comedy that takes place each winter on campus. The festival, which first was held in February 1990, includes professional workshops.

Among the colleges and universities that regularly participate are Bard, Bates, Brandeis, Brown, Columbia, Cornell, Harvard, Emerson, George Washington, Haverford & Bryn Mawr, Kenyon, Manhattan, Marist, NYU, Oaksterdam University, School of Visual Arts, Skidmore, SUNY Binghamton, Swarthmore, Tufts, University of Arizona, University of Maryland, University of Southern California, Vassar, Wesleyan, William & Mary, and Yale.

Four of Skidmore's own comedy groups perform each year, as well as co-sponsoring the event. The groups include two improv groups, The Ad-Liberal Artists, or ad-libs for short, and AKT, more formally known as Awkward Kids Talking. The two sketch comedy groups are Skidomedy, and the Sketchies, who both perform a mix of live and video sketches.

Fun Day
Each spring as classes wind down, the Student Government Association hosts an all-day holiday known as "Fun Day" on the green, featuring bounce-tents, bounce-slides, hot dogs, snow cones, body paint and live music. Students spread blankets out on the lawn where they spend the better part of the day eating, drinking, playing guitars, napping, and generally living up to the nature of the event.

A cappella
Skidmore currently has 6 a cappella groups: 1 all male, 3 co-ed, and 2 female. The Sonneteers, the first of the all female groups, is Skidmore's first and oldest a cappella group (founded in 1947). The Bandersnatchers is the only all male a cappella group on campus. The Dynamics (Dynos) is Skidmore's oldest co-ed a cappella group (founded in 1995). The Drastic Measures (Drastics) is the second oldest co-ed a cappella group. It was founded as an all-inclusive charitable a cappella group; while it is no longer all-inclusive, the group retains its charitable mission to this day. The Accents is the final female a cappella group. All groups perform on and off campus throughout the semester, holding auditions at the beginning of each semester and concluding each semester with a "Jam." The newest a cappella group, the Treblemakers, is Skidmore's third co-ed a cappella group. Chartered in 2010, the Treblemakers is the college's only remaining all-inclusive a cappella group. They constantly perform with many of the other all-inclusive performance groups on campus.
In addition to the a cappella groups, Lift Every Voice, Skidmore's Gospel Choir, was established in 2008 and chartered in 2009 as an official club. It is nowadays known as People Who Sing and has been readjusted to feature more secular music.

Sustainability
Skidmore's Strategic Plan reflects the college's commitment to sustainability and includes a pledge to deepen connections with the local community, emphasize planning for sustainable operation, and reduce the college's environmental footprint. Three of Skidmore's buildings have geothermal heating and cooling systems, and the college has recently hired a sustainability coordinator to assist with efforts to "green" the campus. Skidmore received a grade of "B+" on the Sustainable Endowment Institute's "College Sustainability Report Card 2011." Transportation planning and sustainable investment priorities helped the college to earn this relatively high mark.

Athletics
Skidmore's Athletic Department currently funds and supports 19 varsity teams, including basketball, ice hockey, rowing and riding.

In 2003–2004, players from twelve Thoroughbred teams qualified for regional or national team and individual honors, and more than 95 Skidmore athletes earned league honors. Currently led by Athletic Director Gail Cummings-Danson, Skidmore is a member of the Liberty League and is run out of the recently dedicated Williamson Sports Center.

In 1998 the Women's Tennis Team won the Division III National Title and have been ranked in the Division III top 25 and competed in the NCAA Tournament since 2006. In 2005, the Skidmore Men's Baseball and Lacrosse teams won their conference championships and appeared for the first time in the NCAA Tournament. In 2008 the Women's Crew team was invited to the Eastern Collegiate Athletics Conference in Massachusetts and the Women's Varsity Eight finished the season ranked tenth in the nation. The women's Field Hockey team are four time consecutive Liberty League Champions (2008, 2009, 2010, 2011, and 2013), appeared in the Division III Final Four in 2010 and 2013, as well as in the NCAA tournament 13 times.

The Skidmore Golf team was the first team to participate in an NCAA Championship in 1987 and has continued to do so for the past 26 years.

From 1973 until 1982, Skidmore athletic teams were nicknamed the "Wombats". In 1982 the team nickname was changed to "Thoroughbreds" because it was felt that the wombat "lacked the image of an athlete."

Skidmore College EMS (SCEMS)
Skidmore College Emergency Medical Services, SCEMS for short, is a student-run New York State-certified Basic Life Support first response agency. SCEMS was founded in 2013 by its first Chief Director, David Goroff, Class of 2014. Goroff's successor was Nicholas Friedman, Class of 2017. The current Chief Director is Jesse Epstein, Class of 2019. The agency includes between 60 and 80 volunteers, over 40 of which are Emergency Medical Technicians and a number of First Responders (CPR/AED). SCEMS utilizes a 2014 Ford Escape as a BLS Flycar. SCEMS is in service during the academic year from 4:30pm to 8:30am on Monday through Friday and 24 Hour service on Saturdays and Sundays. SCEMS is funded through private donors and the Skidmore Student Government Association (SGA). SCEMS works closely with the Saratoga Springs Fire Department, who provides Advanced Life Support response and Transport, Wilton EMS, Empire EMS, and Skidmore College Campus Safety.

In Honor
The SS Skidmore Victory (VC2-S-AP3), a World War II cargo ship, was named after the college. Victory ships (VC2) were a class of cargo ship produced in large numbers by American shipyards to replace losses caused by German submarines.

In 2016 Saratoga Race Course named an annual race after the College.  The Skidmore'' is run by 2 year-olds every August on turf at 5/12 furlongs.

Notable alumni

References

Notes

External links

Skidmore Athletics website

 
1903 establishments in New York (state)
Education in Saratoga County, New York
Educational institutions established in 1903
Buildings and structures in Saratoga Springs, New York
Private universities and colleges in New York (state)
Tourist attractions in Saratoga Springs, New York
Liberal arts colleges in New York (state)
New England Hockey Conference teams